Black Eyed Peas (also known as The Black Eyed Peas) are an American musical group consisting of rappers will.i.am, apl.de.ap and Taboo. The group's line-up during the height of their popularity in the 2000s featured Fergie, who replaced Kim Hill in 2002. Originally an alternative hip hop group, they subsequently refashioned themselves as a more marketable pop-rap act. Although the group was founded in Los Angeles in 1995, it was not until the release of their third album Elephunk in 2003 that they achieved high record sales.

The Black Eyed Peas' first major hit was the 2003 single "Where Is the Love?" from Elephunk, which topped the charts in 13 countries, including the United Kingdom, where it spent seven weeks at number one and went on to become Britain's biggest-selling single of 2003. Their fourth album, Monkey Business, was an even bigger worldwide success, and became certified 3× Platinum in the United States. In 2009, the group became one of only 11 artists to have simultaneously held the number-one and number-two spots on the Billboard Hot 100, with their singles "Boom Boom Pow" and "I Gotta Feeling", which topped the chart for an unprecedented 26 consecutive weeks.

The album The E.N.D. produced a third Hot 100 number-one placement with "Imma Be", making the group one of few to ever place three number one singles on the chart from the same album, before being followed with "Rock That Body" and "Meet Me Halfway", which peaked in the top 10 of the Hot 100. "I Gotta Feeling" became the first single to sell more than one million downloads in the United Kingdom. At the 52nd Grammy Awards ceremony, held in January 2010, they won three awards out of six nominations. In November 2010, they released the album The Beginning. In February 2011, they performed in the Super Bowl XLV halftime show. Shortly after, the group announced they would be going on indefinite hiatus to pursue other activities, eventually reuniting in 2015.

In 2018, Fergie was announced to have left the group after making sporadic appearances with them since their return in 2015. That year, she was subsequently replaced by J. Rey Soul for touring, who also appeared as a featured artist on select tracks on the group's seventh album, Masters of the Sun Vol. 1. They released their eighth album, Translation, in June 2020 and their ninth, Elevation in November 2022.

The Black Eyed Peas have sold an estimated 80 million records, making them one of the best-selling groups of all time. They were ranked 12th on Billboards 2000s Decade-End Artist of the Decade Chart, and 7th on the Hot 100 Artists of the Decade.

History

1988–1994: Musical beginnings
In 1988 while attending two different high schools, William James Adams Jr and Allan Pineda Lindo Jr met at the all-ages dance venue Club What? in Los Angeles. They formed a hip-hop dance and music crew named Tribal Nation. Adams took the stage name Will 1X while Pinedo Lindo adopted the name apl.de.ap. Their friends joined the group – Dante Santiago and Mooky Mook, followed shortly by DJ Motiv8. Actor David Faustino opened an all-ages club named Balistyx in 1991 inside the old Whisky a Go Go, and Tribal Nation played there. Rapper Eazy-E caught their show and signed the group to Ruthless Records, changing the group name to Atban Klann. Their first album project, Grass Roots, was shelved at the end of 1993, never to be released. They released a promo song "Let Me Get Down" in 1994, billed as being produced by the Black Eyed Peas: the production team of DJ Motiv8 and Will 1X. Mooky Mook left the group in 1995, and Eazy-E died of HIV/AIDS. The group's contract with Ruthless was stalled, so Santiago also left the group. Will 1X changed his stage name to will.i.am.

1995–2001: Behind the Front and Bridging the Gap
In 1995 will.i.am and apl.de.ap formed a new group named Black Eyed Pods with Jaime Gomez (Taboo), and Kim Hill, a singer who featured on a selected number of their tracks. They later changed "Pods" to "Peas". Unlike the "gangsta rap" sounds of Los Angeles-based hip hop acts at the time, the trio performed with a live band and adopted a conscious musical and appearance style. After being signed to Interscope Records and releasing their debut, Behind the Front (1998) the group (and their accompanying live band) earned critical acclaim. One of the singles from the album was "Joints & Jam", and was featured on the Bulworth soundtrack. Singer Sierra Swan appeared as a guest on the 1998 song "Fallin' Up". Their second album, Bridging the Gap (2000), produced the singles "Weekends" featuring Esthero and "Request + Line" featuring R&B singer Macy Gray. Hill left the band while producing the album, but was still featured on the album tracks for "Hot" and "Tell Your Mama Come" as well as in the video for "Weekends".

2002–2005: Addition of Fergie and Elephunk

In 2002, Stacy Ferguson was chosen as the lead singer, after being introduced to the band by Santiago. Their new album, Elephunk, indicated a shift to a polished pop sound designed to attract mass audiences. In a positive review of the Black Eyed Peas' new-found style, Rolling Stone noted that after the group "hired a blond bombshell named Stacy 'Fergie' Ferguson and gave up their pursuit of backpack-rapper cred, they have made a kind of spiritual practice of recording futuristic songs – a total aesthetic commitment that extends from their garish wardrobes to their United Colors of Benetton worldview."

From Elephunk came "Where Is the Love?", which became the Black Eyed Peas' first major hit, peaking at No. 8 on the U.S. Hot 100. It was more successful abroad, topping the charts in several other countries, including seven weeks at No. 1 in the United Kingdom, where it became the biggest-selling single of 2003. The single had similar results in Australia, staying at No. 1 for six weeks. In an interview with TalkofFame.com, Taboo shared that Justin Timberlake's split with Britney Spears impacted the recording of "Where Is the Love?". The album subsequently spawned "Shut Up", which peaked at No. 2 in the UK and topped the charts and went gold and platinum in the U.S., UK, Germany, and other European markets. The third single from the album, although significantly restyled from the original Elephunk version, "Hey Mama" hit the top 5 in Australia and the top 10 in the UK, Germany and other European countries and reached No. 23 in the U.S. The song received even more exposure in 2003 when it was featured in the first "silhouette" television commercial for the iPod. The fourth single from the album was "Let's Get It Started". It won a 2005 Grammy for Best Rap Performance by a Duo or Group and also received two nominations for Record of the Year and Best Rap Song. In 2004, the Black Eyed Peas embarked on their international Elephunk Tour, touring many countries in Europe, Africa, and Asia.

2004–2008: Monkey Business

Their fourth album, Monkey Business, was recorded through 2004 and was released on May 25, 2005. Much of the pre-production writing was performed on the John Lennon Educational Tour Bus while on the Black Eyed Peas tour of 2004. The album's first single, "Don't Phunk with My Heart", was a hit in the U.S., reaching number three on the Billboard Hot 100. This Billboard status was the highest peak yet of their career in the U.S. (this was later broken when "Boom Boom Pow" peaked at the top spot of the Billboard Hot 100) and earned them another Grammy for Best Rap Performance by a Duo or Group. The song reached three in the UK, and five in Canada, and stayed at number one for three weeks in Australia. Some radio stations, concerned about complaints of obscenity, played an alternative version, "Don't Mess with My Heart". "Don't Lie", the second single from the album, saw success on the U.S. Hot 100, reaching No. 14, although becoming somewhat more successful in the UK and Australia, reaching a peak of No. 6 in both countries. "My Humps", another song from the album, immediately achieved commercial success in the U.S. and also garnered fairly substantial radio play despite the sexually suggestive lyrics. It reached number three on the U.S. Hot 100 and number one in Australia, making it their fourth Australian number one single. However, many mocked the song for its poor lyrical content. For instance, John Bush, writing for AllMusic, described it as "one of the most embarrassing rap performances of the new millennium". Despite this, the album Monkey Business debuted at number two on the U.S. Billboard 200 albums chart, selling over 295,000 copies in its first week and was later certified 3× platinum by the RIAA. Their next and final commercially released single from the album was "Pump It", which borrows much of its sound from "Misirlou", specifically Dick Dale's version. The track peaked at number 8 in Australia and number 18 in the U.S.

In September 2005, the Black Eyed Peas released an iTunes Originals playlist of their greatest hits, as well as some that were re-recorded specially available for purchase through iTunes. The playlist includes popular songs such as "Don't Lie", "Shut Up", and a new version of "Where Is the Love?". It has small stories containing info and commentary about the songs and how the group first met. In autumn 2005, the Black Eyed Peas set off to tour with Gwen Stefani as supporting act. In December 2005, they embarked on the "European Tour", which toured multiple countries in Europe. The European leg which opened in Tel Aviv, Israel, continued onto Ireland, the UK, France and Germany.
After heading to Europe and Asia, they toured the U.S. again. The tour concluded in South America.

In addition to touring, the Black Eyed Peas also headlined the halftime show at the Grey Cup on November 27, 2005.

The Black Eyed Peas starred in a series of web shorts for Snickers, called Instant Def, appearing as a group of hip-hop superheroes. On March 21, 2006, the Black Eyed Peas released a remix album, titled Renegotiations: The Remixes to iTunes. It features remixed versions of "Ba Bump", "My Style", "Feel It", "Disco Club", "They Don't Want Music", "Audio Delite at Low Fidelity" plus the standard version and video of "Like That". The following week, the iTunes compilation was released on CD (without the music video). Participants on the EP included DJ Premier, Pete Rock, Erick Sermon, DJ Jazzy Jeff, and Large Professor. In March 2006, the Black Eyed Peas hit the road again as the featured headliner for the 6th Annual Honda Civic Tour with supporting bands Flipsyde and the Pussycat Dolls. They again brought the John Lennon Educational Tour Bus on the tour with them to craft new songs for Fergie's solo debut album. In 2006, they went on tour with the Pussycat Dolls.

In 2007, the Black Eyed Peas embarked on the Black Blue & You World Tour, visiting more than 20 countries, including: Macau, Sweden, Poland, Romania, Hungary, South Africa, South Korea, Malaysia, India, Indonesia, Israel, Singapore, China, Russia, Kazakhstan, Australia, Nigeria, Mexico, Thailand, Venezuela, Guatemala, Nicaragua, Costa Rica, Argentina, the Philippines, El Salvador and Brazil. This tour was presented by Pepsi, in conjunction with the new "Pepsi More" advertising campaign, featuring the Black Eyed Peas. They recorded the song "More" for the new Pepsi spot. On December 31, 2006, the Black Eyed Peas's tour concluded at Ipanema Beach in Rio de Janeiro, Brazil for more than 1 million people, being their biggest concert ever. The Black Eyed Peas performed at the UK leg of Live Earth on July 7, 2007, at Wembley Stadium, London. will.i.am performed a new song, "Help Us Out", at the event, which would appear on his album, Songs About Girls, as "S.O.S. (Mother Nature)". They headlined the main Ocean Stage at the Summer Sonic Festival in Tokyo, Japan on August 11, and in Osaka, Japan on August 12, 2007.

2009–2011: The E.N.D, The Beginning and hiatus

The group's fifth studio album, The E.N.D, title that stands for "The Energy Never Dies", was released on June 3, 2009. The overall sound of the album has a more electro hop beat rather than the usual hip pop/R&B feeling of their previous albums. Following its release, will.i.am remarked that the album had been inspired by a trip to Australia, specifically the sound of The Presets' "My People". "The energy on the Presets' small little stage was crazy energy. That song My People – that shit is wild," will.i.am said, "That's the reason why this record sounds the way it does – my three months in Australia." In its first week, the album sold 304,000 copies and debuted at number 1 on the Billboard 200. In the United States, the album became the ninth album to top the one million mark in sales in 2009. The album spent 38 weeks within the top 10 of the Billboard 200. The E.N.D was the 7th best-selling album of 2009 in the U.S. It also debuted at number one in Australia, number two in New Zealand and three in the United Kingdom. Three additional singles, "Imma Be", "Alive", and "Meet Me Halfway", were released through the iTunes Store in the three weeks running up to the album's release.

The first single "Boom Boom Pow" was released on March 30, 2009, in the U.S. on iTunes. The single sold 465,000 downloads in its first week of digital release, the third-largest number of download sales in a single week overall, and the largest single-week and debut-download totals by a group in the history of digital-download sales, reaching No. 1 on the U.S. The single also reached the top spot in Billboard Hot 100 and Pop 100. being the group's first U.S. No. 1, holding the spot for twelve consecutive weeks. It also reached number 1 in Australia, Canada, and the UK. On May 21, the Black Eyed Peas released "I Gotta Feeling" (produced by David Guetta) as the official second single from the album. The single charted at number three and then went to number one on the UK Singles Chart. It debuted at number 2 on the Billboard Hot 100 behind "Boom Boom Pow" and later surpassed it, taking the number 1 spot. The Black Eyed Peas joined a group of artists who have held the No.1 and 2 Spot on the Billboard Hot 100 simultaneously. From April 18, 2009, when "Boom Boom Pow" reached No. 1, through October 10, 2009, the last week "I Gotta Feeling" was at No. 1, the group was on top of the chart for 26 weeks, more consecutive weeks than any other artist.

On July 30, 2009, Billboard announced that the Black Eyed Peas set a record for the longest successive No. 1 chart run by a duo or group in the Billboard Hot 100's history. "I Gotta Feeling" hit its fifth consecutive week at No. 1, following 12 weeks at the top by the Peas' "Boom Boom Pow"; Boyz II Men reigned on the chart for two 16-week runs in the mid-'90s. "Meet Me Halfway" was released as the third single from the album in September 2009. The single reached number one in the UK and Australia, making it their third chart topper from The E.N.D in both countries. It also peaked at seven on the U.S. Billboard Hot 100, making it the group's third top-10 single from The E.N.D. "Imma Be" was released as the fourth single in the U.S. on December 15, 2009, reaching number one on the Billboard Hot 100 for two weeks, becoming the group's third number one single on that chart. Heavy airplay in Canada caused "Imma Be" to reach number 5 on the Canadian Hot 100, their fourth consecutive top-five hit from the album. "Rock That Body" was then released as the fifth single, and has so far reached number nine on the Billboard Hot 100.

In September 2009, the group embarked on The E.N.D World Tour, visiting Japan, Thailand, Malaysia, Australia, and New Zealand. In October 2009, they also were the opening acts for 5 concerts of the U2 360° Tour North America leg. The group performed at the Grammys on January 31, 2010. They performed a mash-up of "Imma Be"/"I Gotta Feeling". They won three awards out of the six nominations, including Best Pop Vocal Album for The E.N.D., Best Pop Vocal Performance by a Group for "I Gotta Feeling", and Best Short Form Video for "Boom Boom Pow".

On July 27, 2010, the Black Eyed Peas released a remix album: The E.N.D. Summer 2010 Canadian Invasion Tour: Remix Collection. It was released on iTunes in Canada only, during the Canadian leg of The E.N.D World Tour. It mostly features remixes of the singles taken from The E.N.D. It also features a remix of "Let's Get It Started" taken from Elephunk; the remix was also a bonus track on the deluxe edition of The E.N.D.

Their sixth studio album, The Beginning, was released on November 26, 2010, and received mixed reviews. The album's first single release was called "The Time (Dirty Bit)", and was revealed on October 20, 2010, through will.i.am's Twitter account. The music video was directed by Rich Lee, who had previously directed the video for "Imma Be Rocking That Body". "Just Can't Get Enough", the second single from The Beginning was released on February 18, 2011. Its music video was released on March 16, 2011, and it was filmed in Tokyo, one week before the earthquake and the tsunami. The video was directed by Ben Mor. The group's third single was "Don't Stop the Party" and it was released on May 10, 2011. On the same day, a music video for the song was released on iTunes, along with the single. The video, which is directed by Ben Mor, features on stage and backstage footage of the group during The E.N.D. World Tour in 2009–10. The video premiered on Vevo on May 12, 2011. On May 22, the group appeared on the 2011 Billboard Music Awards and won one of their four nominations, for "Top Duo/Group".

On February 6, 2011, the Black Eyed Peas headlined the Super Bowl XLV halftime show. The Black Eyed Peas were the second artist to have performed in both the Super Bowl and Grey Cup halftime shows, and are one of only three artists to have ever done so as of February 2017. Shania Twain did it before them (performing in the 2002 Grey Cup and 2003 Super Bowl halftime shows) and Lenny Kravitz did it after them (performing in the 2007 Grey Cup and 2014 Super Bowl halftime shows).

On July 6, 2011, during a concert at Alton Towers in Staffordshire, the Black Eyed Peas announced they are taking an indefinite hiatus following the completion of their current tour. will.i.am later confirmed the news on Twitter, adding that the break does not mean they will "stop creating". On November 23, 2011, the group made their last performance for The Beginning Tour in Miami with opening acts including Cee Lo Green and Queen Latifah.

2015–2018: Fergie's departure, addition of J. Rey Soul, and Masters of the Sun
During an interview with NRJ, will.i.am, in talking about his solo album, also confirmed that the Black Eyed Peas would start recording sessions for their seventh studio album in 2015. In an interview on Capital Breakfast, will.i.am said that the Peas would reform in 2015 for their 20th anniversary. The Peas premiered a new song titled "Awesome", that was included in commercials for the 2015 NBA playoffs. The song did not include Fergie, with people questioning if she would be a part of the upcoming album. On the 20th anniversary of their debut, the Peas premiered a new song titled "Yesterday" through Apple Music, though the song also did not feature Fergie.

On August 31, 2016, the Black Eyed Peas released a new version of their 2003 song "Where Is the Love?". The song, titled "#WHERESTHELOVE", is credited to "The Black Eyed Peas featuring The World". The song, as well as the accompanying video feature all four members of the group, will.i.am, Fergie, apl.de.ap, and Taboo, and many other popular artists such as Justin Timberlake, DJ Khaled, and Jessie J. It is the group's most recent work with Fergie, and her last live performance with them happened in 2015.

On June 3, 2017, they performed at the opening ceremony of the 2017 UEFA Champions League Final in the Millennium Stadium, Cardiff, Wales. The performance, which included a pyrotechnic display, ran long and delayed the second-half kickoff by several minutes. Then on the next day, they performed at One Love Manchester, a benefit concert organised by Ariana Grande. On June 4, 2017, a Billboard article rumored that Fergie was departing from the band. will.i.am initially dismissed this, but they announced that she was taking a break from the group to work on her second solo album Double Dutchess, while the remaining members were working on the graphic novel Masters of the Sun.
On January 9, 2018, Black Eyed Peas released their first single without Fergie, titled "Street Livin'". On February 18, 2018, will.i.am confirmed Fergie would not feature on the group's seventh studio album, in an interview with the Daily Star. The next day, former The Voice of the Philippines season 1 finalist and Team Apl.de.ap member Jessica Reynoso (under the stage name "J. Rey Soul") joined the group as a female vocalist and "semi-official" member. On May 17, 2018, the Black Eyed Peas released a single called "Ring the Alarm". The single "Get It" was released on July 10, 2018. The music video for "Constant pt. 1 and 2" was released on YouTube on August 30, 2018. The group released a single named "Big Love" on September 12, 2018. The group released another single titled "Dopeness", featuring South Korean rapper CL, on October 25, 2018. Their seventh studio album, Masters of the Sun Vol. 1, was released the following day on October 26. This marked their first album since 2010's The Beginning. The album is considered to be a sequel to Bridging the Gap.

2019–present: Translation and Elevation

In 2019, the group signed a deal with their new label Epic Records.  On October 11, 2019, the group released the song "Ritmo (Bad Boys for Life)", taken from the Bad Boys for Life soundtrack (2020). The song debuted at number 100 on the US Billboard Hot 100 and became the Black Eyed Peas' 17th Hot 100 entry and their first since 2011's "Don't Stop the Party". "Ritmo" peaked at number 26 on the Hot 100.

On April 10, 2020, the group released the single "Mamacita", which featured J. Rey Soul alongside rapper Ozuna. In an interview with Billboard on May 19, 2020, Reynoso talked about an upcoming eighth album, describing it as  "very Afrobeat, Latin vibe, dance -- just very uplifting music, which is what we need right now at this time of our life, you know?" On June 11, 2020, the band revealed the tracklist and album title as Translation. with the release date as June 19. While promoting the album, will.i.am said that Fergie had stepped back from the group because she wished to devote more time to her role as a mother. will.i.am continued "we're here for her, and she knows how to contact us for a retreat or a breakaway" should she wish to return to the group.

On August 30, 2020, the group's performance of "Ritmo" closed the 2020 MTV Video Music Awards. The performance was met with negative reception due to will.i.am., apl.de.ap and Taboo each performing with an illuminated pelvic area.
 The band was also criticized by longtime fans who were not yet aware of Fergie's previous departure from the group, or J. Rey Soul's membership.

On October 27, 2022, across their social media platforms, the group announced that their ninth studio album, titled Elevation,   which was released on November 11, 2022.

Appearances

On September 8, 2009, the group performed live for Oprah Winfrey's 24th Season Kickoff Party, on Michigan Avenue in Chicago. An estimated 21,000 dancers in the streets performed a flash mob to the live performance of "I Gotta Feeling". The group performed at the American Music Awards of 2009 with the songs "Meet Me Halfway" and "Boom Boom Pow". They also won 2 out of 3 categories in which they were nominated; Favorite Rock/Pop Group & Favorite R&B/Soul Group.

On March 30, 2010, the Black Eyed Peas were the first group to broadcast a concert live in 3D. In June 2010, the Black Eyed Peas performed "Where is the Love?", "Pump It", "Meet me Halfway", "Boom Boom Pow", and "I Gotta Feeling" at the 2010 FIFA World Cup Kick-Off Celebration concert in South Africa. The concert had over 700 million viewers worldwide, making it the biggest event the group performed in. They also performed at T in the Park 2010 on the NME Stage on the Friday July 9 and Oxegen in Kildare, Ireland on Saturday July 10 on the Vodafone stage. In July 2010, the Black Eyed Peas performed "Boom Boom Pow", "Rock That Body" and "I Gotta Feeling" in Central Park as part of Good Morning America's free summer concert series. In December 2010 they appeared on the seventh series of The X Factor in the UK performing "The Time (Dirty Bit)".

The group headlined the Super Bowl XLV halftime show on February 6, 2011. On April 2, 2011, the group appeared on the 24th Annual Nickelodeon Kids' Choice Awards.

After taking a few years on hiatus the group made their first live appearance at the opening ceremony of the 2017 UEFA Champions League Final in Millennium Stadium, Cardiff on June 3, 2017. The following day the group performed at the One Love Manchester benefit concert on June 4, 2017. They performed "Where Is the Love?" with headliner Ariana Grande.

In 2018 the Black Eyed Peas performed as part of the pre-game entertainment at the AFL Grand Final.

The Black Eyed Peas performed in the closing ceremony of the 2019 Southeast Asian Games in the Philippines.

The Black Eyed Peas performed in the 93rd Macy's Thanksgiving Day Parade in 2019. They appeared on the NHL float and performed their latest hit "Ritmo (Bad Boys For Life)."

On the Wonderful World of Disney: Magic Holiday Celebration television holiday special which aired on ABC November 27, 2022, the Black Eyed Peas performed "I Gotta Feeling" and "A Cold Christmas."

Philanthropy
On December 10, 2005, the Black Eyed Peas' cover of the John Lennon classic "Power to the People", which was mostly recorded on the John Lennon Educational Tour Bus, was released by Amnesty International as part of the Make Some Noise campaign to celebrate human rights. The song was later released on the 2007 John Lennon tribute album, Instant Karma: The Amnesty International Campaign to Save Darfur.

The Black Eyed Peas dedicated the music video of their 2011 single "Just Can't Get Enough" to Japan as the country had been hit by an earthquake. The group filmed the music video a week before the earthquake struck. In July 2011, the Black Eyed Peas founded a school for New York teenagers where students of 13–19 years can learn video production and music using professional equipment. The Peapod Foundation, in collaboration with the Adobe Foundation, opened the music academy and media Peapod Adobe Youth Voices in Manhattan on July 19. The school will have its facilities in a building operated by the Urban Arts Partnership, which provides art-school programs for adolescents studying in areas of very low income. Young people will be admitted according to the recommendations of their teachers and their expressions of interest in the subjects taught, such as camera work, editing and graphic design. On September 3, 2011, the group performed a concert in Minot, North Dakota to benefit the victims of the 2011 Souris River flood that damaged over 4,000 homes and displaced over 12,000 people in Minot and along the Souris River. Fergie is married to Minot native, Josh Duhamel. On September 30, 2011, the group performed a free concert, "Chase Presents The Black Eyed Peas and Friends", for over 50,000 people in New York City's Central Park. The event raised over $4 million for the charity.

On August 31, 2016, the Black Eyed Peas' remake of their song, "Where Is the Love?", titled "#WHERESTHELOVE" was released and will.i.am told in an interview that all proceeds raised from the song will go to his "i.am.angel foundation", which funds educational programs and college scholarships in the United States.

Other media
In June 2011, Ubisoft announced they were developing The Black Eyed Peas Experience, a dance video game for Kinect and Wii. On November 11, 2011, the game was released internationally in association with Ubisoft.

Members
Current
 Will.i.am – vocals, piano, synthesizer, bass (1995–2011; 2015–present)
 Apl.de.ap – vocals, drums (1995–2011; 2015–present)
 Taboo – vocals, DJ, guitar (1995–2011; 2015–present)

Former
 Kim Hill – vocals (1995–2000)
 Fergie – vocals (2002–2011; 2015–2018)
Touring
 J. Rey Soul – vocals (2018–present)
Timeline

Discography

Studio albums
Behind the Front (1998)
Bridging the Gap (2000)
Elephunk (2003)
Monkey Business (2005)
The E.N.D. (2009)
The Beginning (2010)
Masters of the Sun Vol. 1 (2018)
Translation (2020)
Elevation (2022)

Tours
 2003: Justified/Stripped Tour (featured for Justin Timberlake and Christina Aguilera)
 2004: Elephunk Tour
 2005: Harajuku Lovers Tour (featured for Gwen Stefani)
 2005–2006: Monkey Business Tour
 2006: Honda Civic Tour
 2007: Black Blue & You Tour
 2009–2010: The E.N.D. World Tour
 2011: The Beginning
 2018: Masters of the Sun Tour
 2020: Translation

Comic books
Black Eyed Peas Present: Masters of the Sun ― The Zombie Chronicles #1 (2017)

Awards and nominations

See also 

 List of artists who have had number-one singles on the UK Official Download Chart
 List of best-selling music downloads in the United Kingdom
 List of Billboard Social 50 number-one artists

References

External links

 
 
 Profile at Forbes
 Black Eyed Peas YouTube channel

 
Hip hop groups from California
American pop music groups
American contemporary R&B musical groups
Pop-rap groups
Dance-pop groups
Electropop groups
Electronic music groups from California
Musical groups from Los Angeles
Musical groups established in 1995
Juno Award for International Album of the Year winners
Rappers from Los Angeles
A&M Records artists
Sony Music Publishing artists
Universal Music Group artists
Interscope Records artists
Grammy Award winners for rap music
MTV Europe Music Award winners
1995 establishments in California
Alternative hip hop groups